Tsori is an ancient city-settlement in Dzheyrakhsky District of Ingushetia, now abandoned village. It is part of the rural settlement of Guli (administrative center rural settlement). Tsori is the ancestral settlement of Ingush taïp Tsoroy and the historical center of Tsorin society.

History 
Historically Tsori was the center of Tsorin society. In the second half of the 18th century (1770s), the German researcher J. A. Güldenstädt indicated Tsori among the total number of Ingush villages and districts.

In 13th June of 1785, a large Chechen force consisting of 500 men approched Tsori, in order to sack it. Learning the plot, Tsorins attacked Chechens during the night and defeated them.

In 1832, due to the collaboration of Ingush with Kazi-Mulla and the murder of a bailiff, Rozen led a punitive expedition on Ingush and went through Dzheyrakh and Metskhal around Khamkhi and Tsori.

Demographics 
In 1883, Tsori had population of 260 completely consisting of Ghalghaï (Ingush)

References

Bibliography 
 
 
 
 
 

Rural localities in Ingushetia